Robert Nelles (October 6, 1761 – July 27, 1842) was a businessman and political figure in Upper Canada.

He was born in Stone Arabia, now known as Nelliston, in Tryon County, New York in 1761. His father, Hendrick William Nelles, served in the Indian Department from 1759-1760, during the French and Indian War and his grandfather, William Nelles, arrived in New York in 1710, and enlisted in the colonial forces for the Quebec Expedition in 1711. Robert was made a lieutenant in the department in 1780 and served during the American Revolution, leading around 60 raids into the interior of New York state in 1781. After the war, father and son settled in the Grand River valley as United Empire Loyalists and received several large land grants in the Niagara District. Nelles built mills and a store on the current site of the town of Grimsby. He also built an early Georgian style manor, which was completed in 1798 (now Nelles Manor Museum). 

In 1797, Robert was appointed Indian agent in the region for a brief time. In 1800, he was elected to the Legislative Assembly of Upper Canada in West York, 1st Lincoln & Haldimand and served until 1808.  He joined the local militia during the War of 1812, eventually becoming lieutenant-colonel. In 1814, he replaced Joseph Willcocks in the legislative assembly in a by-election for 1st Lincoln and Haldimand, serving until 1820.

There are a number of places named after the Nelles family in Grimsby, namely Nelles Public School, Nelles Beach Park, Nelles Boulevard, Nelles Road (North and South), the Nelles Fitch House, and Nelles Manor.

He died in Grimsby in 1842.

Personal life 
Robert married Elizabeth Moore in 1788. She was the daughter of John Moore and Dinah Pettit, who were United Empire Loyalists in New Jersey. 
With Elizabeth, Robert had seven children:

Robert's second wife, Maria nee Waddell Bingle (May 9, 1783 - Jan 2, 1848) was a widow. She had two children from her first marriage: Thomas and Catherine Bingle. Together with Robert, Maria had another six children:

Further reading

References

External links 
Biography at the Dictionary of Canadian Biography Online
 

1761 births
1842 deaths
Members of the Legislative Assembly of Upper Canada
People from Grimsby, Ontario
People from Montgomery County, New York
United Empire Loyalists
Canadian people of English descent
Huguenot participants in the American Revolution